Chwalęcin  is a village in the administrative district of Gmina Nowe Miasto nad Wartą, within Środa Wielkopolska County, Greater Poland Voivodeship, in west-central Poland.

Transport 
Chwalęcin is served by the Chwalęcin skrzyżowanie bus stop operated by JLA, a service run by the county of Jarocin, connecting residents with neighbouring Jarocin, Kruczynek, and Kolniczki on line 2A.

References

Villages in Środa Wielkopolska County